Zamin-e Molla (also Romanized as Zamīn-e Mollā and Zamīn Mollā) is a village in Bemani Rural District, Byaban District, Minab County, Hormozgan Province, Iran. At the 2006 census, its population was 58, in 11 families.

References 

Populated places in Minab County